is a song by Japanese rock band Asian Kung-Fu Generation. It was released as the lead single of their fifth studio album, World World World, on November 29, 2006. The song was conceived on tour when the director of the then-upcoming anime film, Tekkonkinkreet, approached the band and requested a theme song for his film. AKFG proceeded to compose the track and released it as a single a month prior to the film's December 23 debut. The single peaked at number four on the Oricon charts and sold over 50,000 copies in 2006 alone, becoming the 199th single of the year. The song was ranked 5th on fans request for band's 10th anniversary live setlist on September 14, 2013.

Music video
The music video for "Aru Machi no Gunjō" was directed by Hideaki Sunaga. Beginning with a sunrise, the PV alternates from an outer view of a city, the band playing the song in a garage, a raven inside a birdcage, and a fishtank holding a jellyfish before finally concluding with a sunset. The video was nominated for Best Rock Video at MTV Video Music Awards Japan 2007.

Track listing

Personnel
Masafumi Gotō – lead vocals, rhythm guitar
Kensuke Kita – lead guitar, background vocals
Takahiro Yamada –  bass, background vocals
Kiyoshi Ijichi – drums
Asian Kung-Fu Generation – producer
Yusuke Nakamura – single cover art

Charts

External links

References

Asian Kung-Fu Generation songs
2006 singles
Songs written by Masafumi Gotoh
2006 songs
Ki/oon Music singles
Songs written for animated films
Anime songs